Juris Bārzdiņš (born 21 July 1966) is a Latvian politician, member of the Union of Greens and Farmers party and the incumbent Minister of Health of Latvia since 3 November 2010.

References

1966 births
Living people
Politicians from Riga
Liepāja Party politicians
Ministers of Health of Latvia
Riga State Gymnasium No.1 alumni
Riga Stradiņš University alumni